Asphaug is a Norwegian surname. It means "Aspen Hill" and in Norwegian is pronounced "Ausp-Howg." It may refer to:

 Dr. Erik Ian Asphaug (born 1961), American planetary science professor
 7939 Asphaug, asteroid named for Erik Asphaug
 Martin Asphaug (born 1950), Norwegian film director

Norwegian-language surnames